Silk Road is an album by Art Farmer which was recorded in 1996 and released on the Arabesque label the following year.

Reception

The AllMusic review by  Scott Yanow said "Art Farmer has long been one of the most consistent of all brassmen. Playing the flumpet (which is a cross between a trumpet and a flugelhorn), Farmer is heard throughout this 1996 set in top form ... While his sidemen play quite well, the warm-toned and swinging Farmer is consistently the main star, and at age 68 he proves to still be in his prime". In JazzTimes, Jim Ferguson wrote "Richly melodic but bold, Farmer’s influential, distinctive approach is facilitated by his full-toned instrument-the flumpet, a cross between the trumpet and the fluegelhorn. Throughout this eight-tune set, he demonstrates that he is as adept at selecting material and personnel as he is at playing ... Rife with winning performances, Silk Road reflects the current state of one of jazz’s best".

Track listing
 "Tonk" (Ray Bryant) – 6:38
 "Ancient Evening" (Geoff Keezer) – 8:26
 "Stardust" (Hoagy Carmichael, Mitchell Parish) – 5:38
 "Dance of the One" (Don Braden) – 7:34
 "Silk Road" (Keezer) – 5:51
 "Flashback" (Art Farmer) – 6:59
 "I Let a Song Go Out of My Heart" (Duke Ellington, Irving Mills, Henry Nemo, John Redmond) – 7:50
 "Coming Home" (Kenny Davis) – 6:41

Personnel
Art Farmer – flumpet
Ron Blake, Don Braden – tenor saxophone, soprano saxophone
Geoff Keezer – piano
Kenny Davis – double bass
Carl Allen – drums

References

Arabesque Records albums
Art Farmer albums
1997 albums